Vipākaśruta is the eleventh of the 12 Jain āgamas which, as per Śvetámbara tradition, are said to be promulgated by Māhavīra himself and composed by Ganadhara Sudharmaswami. Vipākaśruta, which translates to "The Scripture about Ripening”, contains stories describing those who experience results relating to karmas.

Subject matter of the Agama

It contains 10 stories of people who experience the fruit of bad karma and 10 stories of people who experience the fruit of good karma. These people however simply do not just experience their fruit, but it is explained what they did in the past that brought about the fruit that they experience. The text mentions about the Rohtak city of Haryana ruled by Vesamanadatta and Pusyanandi. It is eleventh of the twelve angas of Svetambara canonical literature. It was written around ninth century AD.

References

Citations

Sources
 

Jain texts
Agamas